Acomatacarus is a genus of mites in the family Trombiculidae. The larvae are parasitic. Species are called also chiggers, scrub itch-mite. The genus includes Acomatacarus arizonensis (lizards), Acomatacarus australiensis (humans, dogs), Acomatacarus galli (chickens, mice, rats, rabbits).

References

Arachnids of North America
Trombidiformes genera
Parasites of dogs
Parasites of reptiles